Clifton is a hillside suburb above Sumner in Christchurch, New Zealand.

Clifton is a volcanic spur extending from Tauhinukorokio / Mount Pleasant. Most of Clifton was originally purchased by Dr Alfred Barker, who had applied for a  land grant from the Christchurch land office. Barker sold his land in 1872. The lower part of Clifton was undeveloped until 1903, when it was subdivided into 93 sections and put up for auction, as far up the hill as Tuawera Terrace, which was originally known as Victoria Terrace. The land further up the hill was subdivided in 1908.

A lower side spur, originally known as Lower Clifton, was bought in 1901 by Samuel Hurst Seager. Seager landscaped and divided the section into 12 plots and it was sold under the name The Spur in 1914. It has been known as the Spur since. This area is the main residential hill area above Sumner.

The ridge that Clifton lies upon, descends from Tauhinukorokio / Mount Pleasant to end in a coastal cliff at the western end of Sumner beach. The cliff overhangs the road between Sumner and Moncks Bay that has been built along the beach. This area by the beach is now known as Peacocks Gallop because John Thomas Peacock would gallop his horse when riding along this section of road on account of his fear of being hit by falling rocks. Earthquakes in 2011 and later in 2016 caused the cliff edge to collapse and recede so much that several clifftop houses were undermined and severely damaged, or left perched precariously on the cliff edge. Shipping containers were stacked two-high on the main road below to protect it from further rockfalls and these subsequently became an impromptu roadside art gallery.

Demographics

Clifton Hill had a population of 1,647 at the 2018 New Zealand census, an increase of 168 people (11.4%) since the 2013 census, and a decrease of 204 people (−11.0%) since the 2006 census. There were 624 households. There were 807 males and 837 females, giving a sex ratio of 0.96 males per female. The median age was 47.3 years (compared with 37.4 years nationally), with 276 people (16.8%) aged under 15 years, 222 (13.5%) aged 15 to 29, 810 (49.2%) aged 30 to 64, and 336 (20.4%) aged 65 or older.

Ethnicities were 96.2% European/Pākehā, 4.0% Māori, 0.4% Pacific peoples, 2.9% Asian, and 1.3% other ethnicities (totals add to more than 100% since people could identify with multiple ethnicities).

The proportion of people born overseas was 28.2%, compared with 27.1% nationally.

Although some people objected to giving their religion, 57.7% had no religion, 33.9% were Christian, 0.2% were Hindu, 0.4% were Buddhist and 2.0% had other religions.

Of those at least 15 years old, 624 (45.5%) people had a bachelor or higher degree, and 111 (8.1%) people had no formal qualifications. The median income was $47,900, compared with $31,800 nationally. The employment status of those at least 15 was that 687 (50.1%) people were employed full-time, 270 (19.7%) were part-time, and 36 (2.6%) were unemployed.

Notes

References

Suburbs of Christchurch